Cacama may refer to:
 Cacama (cicada), a genus of insects
 Cacamatzin, 15th-century Aztec ruler

See also 
 Cacoma, a town in Angola
 Cocama (disambiguation)